Fahrenbach is a town in the district of Neckar-Odenwald-Kreis, in Baden-Württemberg, Germany.

Fahrenbach may also refer to:
 Fahrenbach (Fürth, Hesse), a district of the community Fürth in Hesse, Germany
 Fahrenbach (Rosbach), a river of Hesse, Germany, tributary of the Rosbach
 Wahlebach, a river of Hesse, Germany, in its upper course called Fahrenbach, tributary of the Fulda
 Heinrich Fahrenbach, one of the members of the IV. German Reichstag (Weimar Republic)